Scholengemeenschap Bonaire (SGB) is a secondary school in Bonaire with multiple campuses in the capital Kralendijk; one for Liseo Boneriano Bovenbouw, and another for Liseo Boneriano Onderbouw, VMBO Vakcollege, and SLP - Pro.

Scholengemeenschap Bonaire serves as Bonaire's secondary school, for ages 12–18. It is a Dutch-medium school.  it has over 1,500 students including those of Dutch Caribbean, European Dutch, and other origins.

References

External links
 Scholengemeenschap Bonaire

Secondary schools in the Dutch Caribbean
Education in Bonaire
Buildings and structures in Kralendijk